Fred Dhu (1916-1996) was an Australian rugby league footballer who played in the 1930s and 1940s. He played in the NSWRFL premiership for North Sydney as a centre.

Playing career
Dhu began his first grade career in 1936 and played 10 seasons with Norths.  His brother Herb also played for Norths between 1938 and 1942.  Dhu missed out on playing in the 1943 grand final against Newtown which would turn out to be North Sydney's last ever grand final appearance before exiting the competition in 1999.  Dhu also played 3 games for New South Wales in 1938.  He retired at the end of the 1945 season.

References

North Sydney Bears players
Rugby league centres
1916 births
1996 deaths
Rugby league players from Sydney
New South Wales rugby league team players